French Studies is a quarterly peer-reviewed academic journal published by Oxford University Press on behalf of the Society for French Studies. It was established in 1947 and covers all periods of French and francophone literature and culture. Articles are published in English or French. The journal is accompanied by a sister publication for shorter articles called The French Studies Bulletin.

The editor-in-chief is Timothy Unwin (University of Bristol). From 1987 to 1997, its editor-in-chief was Alan Raitt.

Abstracting and indexing
The journal is abstracted and indexed in:

References

External links

1947 establishments in the United Kingdom
French studies journals
Quarterly journals
French literature
Publications established in 1947
Multilingual journals
English-language journals
French-language journals